Robert Nesta Marley  (6 February 1945 – 11 May 1981) was a Jamaican singer,  musician, and songwriter. Considered one of the pioneers of reggae, his musical career was marked by fusing elements of reggae, ska, and rocksteady, as well as his distinctive vocal and songwriting style. Marley's contributions to music increased the visibility of Jamaican music worldwide, and made him a global figure in popular culture to this day. Over the course of his career, Marley became known as a Rastafari icon, and he infused his music with a sense of spirituality. He is also considered a global symbol of Jamaican music and culture and identity, and was controversial in his outspoken support for democratic social reforms. In 1976, Marley survived an assassination attempt in his home, which was thought to be politically motivated. He also supported legalisation of marijuana, and advocated for Pan-Africanism.

Born in Nine Mile, Jamaica, Marley began his professional musical career in 1963, after forming the Teenagers with Peter Tosh and Bunny Wailer, which after several name changes would become the Wailers. The group released its debut studio album The Wailing Wailers in 1965, which contained the single "One Love", a reworking of "People Get Ready"; the song was popular worldwide, and established the group as a rising figure in reggae. The Wailers released a further eleven studio albums, and after signing to Island Records the band's name became Bob Marley and the Wailers. While initially employing louder instrumentation and singing, the group began engaging in rhythmic-based song construction in the late 1960s and early 1970s, which coincided with Marley's conversion to Rastafari. Around this time, Marley relocated to London, and the group embodied their musical shift with the release of the album The Best of The Wailers (1971).

The group started to gain international attention after signing to Island, and touring in support of the albums Catch a Fire and Burnin' (both 1973). Following the disbandment of the Wailers a year later, Marley carried on under the band's name. The album Natty Dread (1974) received positive reception. In 1975, following the global popularity of Eric Clapton's version of Marley's "I Shot the Sheriff",  Marley had his international breakthrough with his first hit outside Jamaica, with a live version of "No Woman, No Cry", from the Live! album. This was followed by his breakthrough album in the United States, Rastaman Vibration (1976), which reached the Top 50 of the Billboard Soul Charts. A few months after the album's release Marley survived an assassination attempt at his home in Jamaica, which prompted him to permanently relocate to London. During his time in London he recorded the album Exodus (1977); it incorporated elements of blues, soul, and British rock and enjoyed widespread commercial and critical success. In 1977, Marley was diagnosed with acral lentiginous melanoma; he died as a result of the illness in 1981, shortly after baptism into the Ethiopian Orthodox Church.  His fans around the world expressed their grief, and he received a state funeral in Jamaica.

The greatest hits album Legend was released in 1984, and became the best-selling reggae album of all time. Marley also ranks as one of the best-selling music artists of all time, with estimated sales of more than 75 million records worldwide. He was posthumously honoured by Jamaica soon after his death with a designated Order of Merit by his nation. In 1994, he was inducted into the Rock and Roll Hall of Fame. Rolling Stone ranked him No. 11 on its list of the 100 Greatest Artists of All Time. His other achievements include a Grammy Lifetime Achievement Award, a star on the Hollywood Walk of Fame, and induction into the Black Music & Entertainment Walk of Fame.

Early life and career 
Robert Nesta Marley was born on 6 February 1945 at the farm of his maternal grandfather in Nine Mile, Saint Ann Parish, Jamaica, to Norval Sinclair Marley and Cedella Malcolm. Norval Marley was from Crowborough, East Sussex in England, then resident of Clarendon Parish, Norval claimed to have been a captain in the Royal Marines; at the time of his marriage to Cedella Malcolm, an Afro-Jamaican then 18 years old, he was employed as a plantation overseer. Bob Marley's full name is Robert Nesta Marley, though some sources give his birth name as Nesta Robert Marley, with a story that when Marley was still a boy, a Jamaican passport official reversed his first and middle names because Nesta sounded like a girl's name. Norval provided financial support for his wife and child but seldom saw them as he was often away. Bob Marley attended Stepney Primary and Junior High School which serves the catchment area of Saint Ann. In 1955, when Bob Marley was 10 years old, his father died of a heart attack at the age of 70. Marley's mother went on later to marry Edward Booker, a civil servant from the United States, giving Marley two half-brothers: Richard and Anthony.

Bob Marley and Neville Livingston (later known as Bunny Wailer) had been childhood friends in Nine Mile. They had started to play music together while at Stepney Primary and Junior High School. Marley left Nine Mile with his mother when he was 12 and moved to Trenchtown, Kingston. She and Thadeus Livingston (Bunny Wailer's father) had a daughter together whom they named Claudette Pearl, who was a younger sister to both Bob and Bunny. Now that Marley and Livingston were living together in the same house in Trenchtown, their musical explorations deepened to include the new ska music, and the latest R&B from United States radio stations whose broadcasts reached Jamaica. Marley formed a vocal group with Bunny Wailer, and Peter Tosh. The line-up was known variously as the Teenagers, the Wailing Rudeboys, the Wailing Wailers and finally just the Wailers. Joe Higgs, who was part of the successful vocal act Higgs and Wilson, lived nearby and encouraged Marley. Marley and the others did not play any instruments at this time, and were more interested in being a vocal harmony group. Higgs helped them develop their vocal harmonies, and started to teach Marley how to play guitar.

Musical career

1962–1972: Early years 
In February 1962, Marley recorded four songs, "Judge Not", "One Cup of Coffee", "Do You Still Love Me?" and "Terror", at Federal Studios for local music producer Leslie Kong. Three of the songs were released on Beverley's with "One Cup of Coffee" being released under the pseudonym Bobby Martell.

In 1963, Bob Marley, Bunny Wailer, Peter Tosh, Junior Braithwaite, Beverley Kelso, and Cherry Smith were called the Teenagers. They later changed the name to the Wailing Rudeboys, then to the Wailing Wailers, at which point they were discovered by record producer Coxsone Dodd, and finally to the Wailers. Their single "Simmer Down" for the Coxsone label became a Jamaican No. 1 in February 1964 selling an estimated 70,000 copies. The Wailers, now regularly recording for Studio One, found themselves working with established Jamaican musicians such as Ernest Ranglin (arranger "It Hurts To Be Alone"), the keyboardist Jackie Mittoo and saxophonist Roland Alphonso. By 1966, Braithwaite, Kelso, and Smith had left the Wailers, leaving the core trio of Bob Marley, Bunny Wailer, and Peter Tosh.

In 1966, Marley married Rita Anderson, and moved near his mother's residence in Wilmington, Delaware, in the United States for a short time, during which he worked as a DuPont lab assistant, and on the assembly line and as a fork lift operator at a Chrysler plant in nearby Newark, under the alias Donald Marley.

Though raised as a Catholic, Marley became interested in Rastafari beliefs in the 1960s, when away from his mother's influence. After returning to Jamaica, Marley formally converted to Rastafari and began to grow dreadlocks.

After a financial disagreement with Dodd, Marley and his band teamed up with Lee "Scratch" Perry and his studio band, the Upsetters. Although the alliance lasted less than a year, they recorded what many consider the Wailers' finest work. Marley and Perry split after a dispute regarding the assignment of recording rights, but they would continue to work together.

1969 brought another change to Jamaican popular music in which the beat slowed down even further. The new beat was a slow, steady, ticking rhythm that was first heard on The Maytals song "Do the Reggay". Marley approached producer Leslie Kong, who was regarded as one of the major developers of the reggae sound. For the recordings, Kong combined the Wailers with his studio musicians called Beverley's All-Stars, which consisted of the bassists Lloyd Parks and Jackie Jackson, the drummer Paul Douglas, the keyboard players Gladstone Anderson and Winston Wright, and the guitarists Rad Bryan, Lynn Taitt, and Hux Brown. As David Moskowitz writes, "The tracks recorded in this session illustrated the Wailers' earliest efforts in the new reggae style. Gone are the ska trumpets and saxophones of the earlier songs, with instrumental breaks now being played by the electric guitar." The songs recorded would be released as the album The Best of The Wailers, including tracks "Soul Shakedown Party", "Stop That Train", "Caution", "Go Tell It on the Mountain", "Soon Come", "Can't You See", "Soul Captives", "Cheer Up", "Back Out", and "Do It Twice".

Between 1968 and 1972, Bob and Rita Marley, Peter Tosh and Bunny Wailer re-cut some old tracks with JAD Records in Kingston and London in an attempt to commercialise the Wailers' sound. Bunny later asserted that these songs "should never be released on an album ... they were just demos for record companies to listen to". In 1968, Bob and Rita visited songwriter Jimmy Norman at his apartment in the Bronx. Norman had written the extended lyrics for Kai Winding's "Time Is on My Side" (covered by the Rolling Stones) and had also written for Johnny Nash and Jimi Hendrix. A three-day jam session with Norman and others, including Norman's co-writer Al Pyfrom, resulted in a 24-minute tape of Marley performing several of his own and Norman-Pyfrom's compositions. This tape is, according to Reggae archivist Roger Steffens, rare in that it was influenced by pop rather than reggae, as part of an effort to break Marley into the US charts. According to an article in The New York Times, Marley experimented on the tape with different sounds, adopting a doo-wop style on "Stay With Me" and "the slow love song style of 1960s artists" on "Splish for My Splash". An artist yet to establish himself outside his native Jamaica, Marley lived in Ridgmount Gardens, Bloomsbury, during 1972.

1972–1974: Move to Island Records 
In 1972, Bob Marley signed with CBS Records in London and embarked on a UK tour with soul singer Johnny Nash. While in London the Wailers asked their road manager Brent Clarke to introduce them to Chris Blackwell, who had licensed some of their Coxsone releases for his Island Records. The Wailers intended to discuss the royalties associated with these releases; instead, the meeting resulted in the offer of an advance of £4,000 to record an album. Since Jimmy Cliff, Island's top reggae star, had recently left the label, Blackwell was primed for a replacement. In Marley, Blackwell recognised the elements needed to snare the rock audience: "I was dealing with rock music, which was really rebel music. I felt that would really be the way to break Jamaican music. But you needed someone who could be that image. When Bob walked in he really was that image." The Wailers returned to Jamaica to record at Harry J's in Kingston, which resulted in the album Catch a Fire.

Primarily recorded on an eight-track, Catch a Fire marked the first time a reggae band had access to a state-of-the-art studio and were accorded the same care as their rock 'n' roll peers. Blackwell desired to create "more of a drifting, hypnotic-type feel than a reggae rhythm", and restructured Marley's mixes and arrangements. Marley travelled to London to supervise Blackwell's overdubbing of the album at Island Studios, which included tempering the mix from the bass-heavy sound of Jamaican music and omitting two tracks.

The Wailers' first album for Island, Catch a Fire, was released worldwide in April 1973, packaged like a rock record with a unique Zippo lighter lift-top. Initially selling 14,000 units, it received a positive critical reception. It was followed later that year by the album Burnin' which included the song "I Shot the Sheriff". Eric Clapton was given the album by his guitarist George Terry in the hope that he would enjoy it. Clapton was impressed and chose to record a cover version of "I Shot the Sheriff" which became his first US hit since "Layla" two years earlier and reached number 1 on the Billboard Hot 100 on 14 September 1974. Many Jamaicans were not keen on the new reggae sound on Catch a Fire, but the Trenchtown style of Burnin found fans across both reggae and rock audiences.

During this period, Blackwell gifted his Kingston residence and company headquarters at 56 Hope Road (then known as Island House) to Marley. Housing Tuff Gong Studios, the property became not only Marley's office but also his home.

The Wailers were scheduled to open 17 shows in the US for Sly and the Family Stone. After four shows, the band was fired because they were more popular than the acts they were opening for. The Wailers disbanded in 1974, with each of the three main members pursuing a solo career.

1974–1976: Line-up changes and shooting 

Despite the break-up, Marley continued recording as "Bob Marley & The Wailers". His new backing band included brothers Carlton and Aston "Family Man" Barrett on drums and bass respectively, Junior Marvin and Al Anderson on lead guitar, Tyrone Downie and Earl "Wya" Lindo on keyboards, and Alvin "Seeco" Patterson on percussion. The "I Threes", consisting of Judy Mowatt, Marcia Griffiths, and Marley's wife, Rita, provided backing vocals. In 1975, Marley had his international breakthrough with his first hit outside Jamaica, with a live version of "No Woman, No Cry", from the Live! album. This was followed by his breakthrough album in the United States, Rastaman Vibration (1976), which reached the Top 50 of the Billboard Soul Charts.

On 3 December 1976, two days before "Smile Jamaica", a free concert organised by the Jamaican Prime Minister Michael Manley in an attempt to ease tension between two warring political groups, Marley, his wife, and manager Don Taylor were wounded in an assault by unknown gunmen inside Marley's home. Taylor and Marley's wife sustained serious injuries but later made full recoveries. Bob Marley received minor wounds in the chest and arm. The attempt on his life was thought to have been politically motivated, as many felt the concert was really a support rally for Manley. Nonetheless, the concert proceeded, and an injured Marley performed as scheduled, two days after the attempt. When asked why, Marley responded, "The people who are trying to make this world worse aren't taking a day off. How can I?" The members of the group Zap Pow played as Bob Marley's backup band before a festival crowd of 80,000 while members of The Wailers were still missing or in hiding.

1976–1979: Relocation to England 
Marley left Jamaica at the end of 1976, and after a month-long "recovery and writing" sojourn at the site of Chris Blackwell's Compass Point Studios in Nassau, Bahamas, arrived in England, where he spent two years in self-imposed exile.

Whilst in England, he recorded the albums Exodus and Kaya. Exodus stayed on the British album charts for 56 consecutive weeks. It included four UK hit singles: "Exodus", "Waiting in Vain", "Jamming", and "One Love" (which interpolates Curtis Mayfield's hit, "People Get Ready"). During his time in London, he was arrested and received a conviction for possession of a small quantity of cannabis. In 1978, Marley returned to Jamaica and performed at another political concert, the One Love Peace Concert, again in an effort to calm warring parties. Near the end of the performance, by Marley's request, Michael Manley (leader of then-ruling People's National Party) and his political rival Edward Seaga (leader of the opposing Jamaica Labour Party) joined each other on stage and shook hands.

Under the name Bob Marley and the Wailers 11 albums were released, four live albums and seven studio albums. The releases included Babylon by Bus, a double live album with 13 tracks, was released in 1978 and received critical acclaim. This album, and specifically the final track "Jamming" with the audience in a frenzy captured the intensity of Marley's live performances.

1979–1980: Later years 
Survival, a defiant and politically charged album, was released in 1979. Tracks such as "Zimbabwe", "Africa Unite", "Wake Up and Live", and "Survival" reflected Marley's support for the struggles of Africans. His appearance at the Amandla Festival in Boston in July 1979 showed his strong opposition to South African apartheid, which he already had shown in his song "War" in 1976. In early 1980, he was invited to perform at 17 April celebration of Zimbabwe's Independence Day.

Uprising (1980) was Bob Marley's final studio album, and is one of his most religious productions; it includes "Redemption Song" and "Forever Loving Jah". Confrontation, released posthumously in 1983, contained unreleased material recorded during Marley's lifetime, including the hit "Buffalo Soldier" and new mixes of singles previously only available in Jamaica.

Illness and death 

In July 1977, Marley was diagnosed with a type of malignant melanoma under a toenail. Contrary to urban legend, this lesion was not primarily caused by an injury during a football match that year, but was instead a symptom of already-existing cancer. He had to see two doctors before a biopsy was done, which confirmed acral lentiginous melanoma. Unlike other melanomas, usually on skin exposed to the sun, acral lentiginous melanoma occurs in places that are easy to miss, such as the soles of the feet, or under toenails. Although it is the most common melanoma in people with dark skin, it is not widely recognised and was not mentioned in the most popular medical textbook of the time.

Marley rejected his doctors' advice to have his toe amputated (which would have hindered his performing career), citing his religious beliefs, and instead, the nail and nail bed were removed and a skin graft was taken from his thigh to cover the area. Despite his illness, he continued touring and was in the process of scheduling a 1980 world tour.

The album Uprising was released in May 1980. The band completed a major tour of Europe, where it played its biggest concert to 100,000 people in Milan, Italy. After the tour, Marley went to the United States, where he performed two shows at Madison Square Garden in New York City as part of the Uprising Tour. He collapsed while jogging in Central Park and was taken to the hospital, where it was found that his cancer had spread to his brain, lungs, and liver.

Marley's last concert took place two days later at the Stanley Theater (now The Benedum Center For The Performing Arts) in Pittsburgh, Pennsylvania, on 23 September 1980. The only known photographs from the show were included in Kevin Macdonald's 2012 documentary film Marley.

Shortly afterward, Marley's health deteriorated as his cancer had spread throughout his body. The rest of the tour was canceled, and Marley sought treatment at the clinic of Josef Issels in Bavaria, Germany, where he underwent an alternative cancer treatment called Issels treatment, partly based on avoidance of certain foods, drinks, and other substances. After eight months of failing to effectively treat his advancing cancer, Marley boarded a plane for his home in Jamaica. During the flight, Marley's vital functions worsened. After landing in Miami, Florida, he was taken to Cedars of Lebanon Hospital (later University of Miami Hospital) for immediate medical attention, where he died on 11 May 1981, aged 36, due to the spread of melanoma to his lungs and brain. His final words to his son Ziggy were: "On your way up, take me up. On your way down, don't let me down."

Marley was given a state funeral in Jamaica on 21 May 1981 that combined elements of Ethiopian Orthodoxy and Rastafari tradition. He was buried in a chapel near his birthplace in Nine Mile; his casket contained his red Gibson Les Paul guitar, a Bible opened at Psalm 23, and a stalk of ganja placed there by his widow Rita Marley. On 21 May 1981, Jamaican Prime Minister Edward Seaga delivered the final funeral eulogy to Marley, saying:

Legacy

Awards and honours 

 1976: Rolling Stone Band of the Year
 June 1978: Awarded the Peace Medal of the Third World from the United Nations.
 February 1981: Awarded the Jamaican Order of Merit, then the nation's third highest honour.
 March 1994: Inducted into the Rock and Roll Hall of Fame.
 1999: Album of the Century for Exodus by Time magazine.
 February 2001: A star on the Hollywood Walk of Fame.
 February 2001: Awarded Grammy Lifetime Achievement Award.
 2004: Rolling Stone ranked him No. 11 on their list of the 100 Greatest Artists of All Time.
 2004: Among the first inductees into the UK Music Hall of Fame
 "One Love" named song of the millennium by BBC.
 Voted as one of the greatest lyricists of all time by a BBC poll.
 2006: A blue plaque was unveiled at his first UK residence in Ridgmount Gardens, London, dedicated to him by the Nubian Jak Community Trust and supported by the Foreign and Commonwealth Office.
 2010: Catch a Fire inducted into the Grammy Hall of Fame (Reggae Album).
 2022: Inducted into the Black Music & Entertainment Walk of Fame.

Other tributes 

A statue was inaugurated, next to the national stadium on Arthur Wint Drive in Kingston to commemorate him. In 2006, the New York City Department of Education co-named a portion of Church Avenue from Remsen Avenue to East 98th Street in the East Flatbush section of Brooklyn as "Bob Marley Boulevard". In 2008, a statue of Marley was inaugurated in Banatski Sokolac, Serbia.

Internationally, Marley's message also continues to reverberate among various indigenous communities. For instance, members of the Native American Hopi and Havasupai tribes revere his work. There are also many tributes to Bob Marley throughout India, including restaurants, hotels, and cultural festivals.

Marley evolved into a global symbol, which has been endlessly merchandised through a variety of media. In the light of this, author Dave Thompson in his book, Reggae and Caribbean Music, laments what he perceives to be the commercialised pacification of Marley's more militant edge, stating:

Several film adaptations have evolved as well. For instance, a feature-length documentary about his life, Rebel Music, won various awards at the Grammys. With contributions from Rita, The Wailers, and Marley's lovers and children, it also tells much of the story in his own words. In February 2008, director Martin Scorsese announced his intention to produce a documentary movie on Marley. The film was set to be released on 6 February 2010, on what would have been Marley's 65th birthday. However, Scorsese dropped out due to scheduling problems. He was replaced by Jonathan Demme, who dropped out due to creative differences with producer Steve Bing during the beginning of editing. Kevin Macdonald replaced Demme and the film, Marley, was released on 20 April 2012. In 2011, ex-girlfriend and filmmaker Esther Anderson, along with Gian Godoy, made the documentary Bob Marley: The Making of a Legend, which premiered at the Edinburgh International Film Festival.

In October 2015, Jamaican author Marlon James's novel, A Brief History of Seven Killings, a fictional account of the attempted assassination of Marley, won the 2015 Man Booker Prize at a ceremony in London.

In February 2020, Get Up, Stand Up! The Bob Marley Musical was announced by writer Lee Hall and director Dominic Cooke, starring Arinzé Kene as Bob Marley. It was premiered at London's Lyric Theatre on 20 October 2021, after being postponed from its original February premiere due to the COVID-19 pandemic.

Personal life

Religion and beliefs 
Bob Marley was a member for some years of the Rastafari movement, whose culture was a key element in the development of reggae. He became an ardent proponent of Rastafari, taking its music out of the socially deprived areas of Jamaica and onto the international music scene. As part of being a Rastafarian he felt that Haile Selassie of Ethiopia was an incarnation of God or "Jah". Archbishop Abuna Yesehaq baptised Marley into the Ethiopian Orthodox Church in the presence of his wife Rita Marley and their children, giving him the name Berhane Selassie, on 4 November 1980, shortly before his death.

As a Rastafarian Marley supported the legalisation of cannabis or "ganja", which Rastafarians believe is an aid to meditation. Marley began to use cannabis when he converted to the Rastafari faith from Catholicism in 1966. He was arrested in 1968 after being caught with cannabis but continued to use marijuana in accordance with his religious beliefs. Of his marijuana usage, he said, "When you smoke herb, herb reveal yourself to you. All the wickedness you do, the herb reveal itself to yourself, your conscience, show up yourself clear, because herb make you meditate. Is only a natural t'ing and it grow like a tree." Marley saw marijuana usage as a vital factor in religious growth and connection with Jah, and as a way to philosophise and become wiser.

Marley was a Pan-Africanist and believed in the unity of African people worldwide. His beliefs were rooted in his Rastafari religious beliefs. He was substantially inspired by Marcus Garvey, and had anti-imperialist and pan-Africanist themes in many of his songs, such as "Zimbabwe", "Exodus", "Survival", "Blackman Redemption", and "Redemption Song". "Redemption Song" draws influence from a speech given by Marcus Garvey in Nova Scotia, 1937. Marley held that independence of African countries from European domination was a victory for all those in the African diaspora. In the song "Africa Unite", he sings of a desire for all peoples of the African diaspora to come together and fight against "Babylon"; similarly, in the song "Zimbabwe", he marks the liberation of the whole continent of Africa, and evokes calls for unity between all Africans, both within and outside Africa.

Family 
Bob Marley married Alpharita Constantia "Rita" Anderson in Kingston, Jamaica, on 10 February 1966. Marley had many children: 3 born to his wife Rita & adopted Rita's two children from other relationships as his own and they have the Marley name. Plus several others with different women. The official Bob Marley website acknowledges 11 children.

Those listed on the official site are:
 Sharon, born 23 November 1964, daughter of Rita from a previous relationship, but then adopted by Marley after his marriage with Rita
 Cedella, born 23 August 1967, to Rita
 David "Ziggy", born 17 October 1968, to Rita
 Stephen, born 20 April 1972, to Rita
 Robert "Robbie", born 16 May 1972, to Pat Williams
 Rohan, born 19 May 1972, to Janet Hunt
 Karen, born 1973, to Janet Bowen
 Stephanie Marley, born 17 August 1974 (from an extramarital affair Rita had with Owen “Ital Tacky” Stewart a former Jamaican soccer player) Nevertheless Bob adopted her as one of his own, giving her official recognition as one of his children, thereby entitling her to his estate.
 Julian, born 4 June 1975, to Lucy Pounder
 Ky-Mani, born 26 February 1976, to Anita Belnavis
 Damian, born 21 July 1978, to Cindy Breakspeare

Other sites have noted additional individuals who claim to be family members, as noted below:

 Makeda was born on 30 May 1981, to Yvette Crichton, after Marley's death. Meredith Dixon's book lists her as Marley's child, but she is not listed as such on the Bob Marley official website.
 Various websites, for example, also list Imani Carole, born 22 May 1963, to Cheryl Murray; but she does not appear on the official Bob Marley website.

Marley also has three notable grandchildren, musician Skip Marley, American football player Nico Marley, and model Selah Marley.

Association football 
Aside from music, association football played a major role throughout his life. As well as playing the game, in parking lots, fields, and even inside recording studios, growing up he followed the Brazilian club Santos and its star player Pelé and was also a supporter of English football club Tottenham Hotspur and Argentine midfielder Ossie Ardiles, who played for the club from 1978 for a decade.

Marley surrounded himself with people from the sport, and in the 1970s made the Jamaican international footballer Allan "Skill" Cole his tour manager. He told a journalist, "If you want to get to know me, you will have to play football against me and the Wailers."

Discography

Studio albums 
 The Wailing Wailers (1965)
 Soul Rebels (1970)
 Soul Revolution Part II (1971)
 The Best of the Wailers (1971)
 Catch a Fire (1973)
 Burnin' (1973)
 Natty Dread (1974)
 Rastaman Vibration (1976)
 Exodus (1977)
 Kaya (1978)
 Survival (1979)
 Uprising (1980)
 Confrontation (1983)

Live albums 
 Live! (1975)
 Babylon by Bus (1978)

See also 
 Outline of Bob Marley
 List of peace activists
 Fabian Marley
 Desis bobmarleyi – an underwater spider species named in honor of Marley

References

Sources 

 

 Marley, Rita; Jones, Hettie (2004). No Woman No Cry: My Life with Bob Marley, Hyperion Books,

Further reading 

 Farley, Christopher (2007). Before the Legend: The Rise of Bob Marley, Amistad Press, 
 Goldman, Vivien (2006). The Book of Exodus: The Making and Meaning of Bob Marley and the Wailers' Album of the Century, Aurum Press,

External links 

 
 
 Bob Marley at Discogs

 
1945 births
1981 deaths
20th-century Christians
Deaths from cancer in Florida
Cannabis music
Colony of Jamaica people
Converts to Tewahedo Orthodoxy
Converts to the Rastafari movement
Deaths from melanoma
Ethiopian Orthodox Christians
Former Roman Catholics
Grammy Lifetime Achievement Award winners
Island Records artists
Jamaican Christians
Jamaican expatriates in the United Kingdom
Jamaican expatriates in the United States
Jamaican guitarists
20th-century Jamaican male singers
Jamaican pan-Africanists
Jamaican people of Ghanaian descent
Jamaican Rastafarians
Jamaican reggae singers
Jamaican songwriters
Bob
Musicians from Wilmington, Delaware
People from Saint Andrew Parish, Jamaica
People from Saint Ann Parish
Performers of Rastafarian music
Recipients of the Order of Merit (Jamaica)
Reggae guitarists
Folk guitarists
Resonator guitarists
Roots Reggae Library
Shooting survivors
The Wailers members
Guitarists from Delaware
Music in the movement against apartheid
International opposition to apartheid in South Africa
Anti-apartheid activists